Edureeta is a 1977 Indian Telugu-language drama film directed by V. Madhusudhana Rao. The film stars N. T. Rama Rao and Vanisri, with music composed by Satyam. It is a remake of the Bengali/Hindi film Amanush (1975). The film was released on 22 July 1977.

Plot 
The film begins in a village where Inspector Ananda Rao a newly appointee comes across sundry characters, the diabolic president Bhushaiah, a benevolent Dr. Dharmaiah, and his sister Radha a school teacher. Anand Rao is particularly fascinated by a drunkard, Madhu who constantly lies in a cauldron of misery. Indeed, Madhu belongs to a Zamindar family who lost all and the village ostracizes him including his beloved Radha. 

Currently, he makes rowing a boat his livelihood and the only one that showers affection on him is the cute village girl Manga. Besides, Madhu always impedes the enormities of Bhushaiah. So, he forms a false allegation about him when Anand Rao also misconstrues without going into the merits and whips him. Later, Dr. Dharmaiah pins on Anand Rao by divulging the past. 

Aforetime, Madhu returns after accomplishing his education when Bhushaiah used to be their Diwan at his grandfather the Zamindar. Forthwith, he affirms to the construction of a barrage to shield the village from the floods. Accordingly, he requests his grandfather for funds which he denies. Exploiting it, Bhushaiah heists the amount provokes Zamindar against Madhu by incriminating him, and he is sentenced. Plus, he denounces him for deceiving a girl and charges her death on him which Radha too deludes. Following the return, Madhu spots Bhushaiah grabbing his property utilizing Zamindar’s death. 

Listening to it, Anand Rao repents and embarks on a mission by reforming Madhu when the two turn into besties. Moreover, he attains a dam contract which Madhu fulfills commendably. Parallelly, Anand Rao arouses Madhu’s virtue before Radha. Now a catastrophe arises when the village is endangered by raging floodwaters that threaten to breach the dam. During that plight, they seek Madhu takes the mantle of saving, but he spurns them, accusing them of his grief. Anyhow, on request by Radha, he relents and saves them from havoc. Hence, his honor is restored along with his love. At last, Madhu ceases Bhushaiah. Finally, the movie ends on a happy note with the marriage of Madhu & Radha.

Cast 
N. T. Rama Rao as Madhu
Vanisri as Radha
Jayasudha as Manga
Jaggayya as Inspector Ananda Rao
Satyanarayana as Bhushaiah
Kanta Rao as Dr. Dharmaiah
Padmanabham as Priest
Mukkamala as Zamindar
Ramana Murthy as Engineer Prasada Rao
Sakshi Ranga Rao as Thoka Anjaneyulu
Balakrishna as Subbulu
Sarathi as Abbulu
Jagga Rao as Jaggu

Soundtrack 
Music composed by Satyam.

References

External links 
 
 

1970s Telugu-language films
1977 drama films
Films directed by V. Madhusudhana Rao
Films scored by Satyam (composer)
Indian drama films
Telugu remakes of Bengali films
Telugu remakes of Hindi films
Films based on works by Shaktipada Rajguru